Rinaldo d'Este (1618 – 30 September 1672) was an Italian Catholic Cardinal.

Early life and education
Rinaldo d'Este was born in 1618, the son of Alfonso III d'Este, Duke of Modena and Isabella of Savoy. He was the brother of Francesco d'Este who succeeded his father as Duke of Modena. As a boy, he undertook military study in Modena but left to answer an ecclesiastic calling.

Early ecclesiastic career
Little is known of his early Church career but he was elevated to cardinal by Pope Urban VIII at the request of Ferdinand III, Holy Roman Emperor in 1641 and this was published in the consistory of 16 December that year. However, the First War of Castro broke out between Barberini Pope Urban and the Farnese Dukes of Parma. As a result, Rinaldo d'Este refused to travel to Rome to receive his cardinal's hat. Instead, when Pope Urban died in 1644, he travelled to Rome to participate in the Papal conclave which elected Pope Innocent X who then conducted the ceremony following his own Papal coronation.

After Pope Innocent's election, though, d'Este had a falling out with members of the Spanish faction of the College of Cardinals who had been the driving force behind the Pope's election against candidates put forward by the French faction. After the falling out, d'Este declared himself for France. As a result, though his family had previously been in conflict with the Barberini, he became their ardent supporters while they were in exile in France. He returned to Modena and became temporary ruler when his brother left to fight the Spanish in 1647.

Later he returned to Rome upon hearing that the Admiral of Castile was visiting as ambassador of the Kingdom of Spain. The Admiral, though, saw every cardinal except for d'Este on the grounds that d'Este had declared himself for France. The slight escalated and both the Admiral and Cardinal d'Este raised 600 men-at-arms each in preparation for armed conflict; d'Este having pawned jewels to hire militia as neither his family nor his French supporters had been able to raise funds quickly enough. Eventually, the conflict was quelled when Pope Innocent ordered his own troops to enter Rome to keep the peace, though several militiamen on both sides were killed.

Later ecclesiastic career
He was elected Bishop of Reggio Emilia in December 1650 and participated in the Papal conclave of 1655 which elected Pope Alexander VII, the conclave of 1667, which elected Pope Clement IX and the conclave of 1669–1670, which elected Pope Clement X. At various times he returned to Modena to rule in his brother's absence, his nephew Rinaldo being too young to take his father's place.

On 24 August 1671 he opted for the order of bishops and was appointed Cardinal-Bishop of Palestrina.

He died on 30 September 1672 in Modena.

He was the principal consecrator of Francesco Casati, Titular Archbishop of Trapezus (1670).

References

1618 births
1672 deaths
17th-century Italian nobility
17th-century Italian cardinals
Cardinal-bishops of Palestrina
Sons of monarchs